Joseph Weisberg is an American television writer, producer, novelist, and school teacher. Weisberg is best known as the creator and showrunner of the FX TV series The Americans.

Career
A 1987 graduate of Yale University, Weisberg became a CIA officer three years after graduation, and after a short career with the Agency, Weisberg taught at The Summit School, a private special education high school in Queens, New York until 2010 when he went on to pursue a career in television. One of his final projects at Summit School was helping students found the school newspaper, The Summit Sun.

Weisberg wrote episodes for TNT's alien invasion series Falling Skies and the DirecTV legal drama Damages. He then created The Americans, an FX series centering on two KGB sleeper agents, who pose as American citizens in Washington, D.C. during the 1980s. The Americans was executive-produced by Weisberg and Justified creator Graham Yost. In 2022, Weisberg co-created and showran the limited FX series The Patient.

Weisberg authored two novels: 10th Grade and An Ordinary Spy. An Ordinary Spy was nominated for the Believer Book Award.

Weisberg is also the author of the non-fiction book Russia Upside Down: An Exit Strategy for the Second Cold War.

Personal life
Weisberg grew up in a Jewish family in Chicago, the son of civil rights attorney Bernard Weisberg and former Commissioner of Cultural Affairs Lois Weisberg. He is the younger brother of Slate Group editor-in-chief Jacob Weisberg. Weisberg married Julia Rothwax, former press secretary to presidential candidates Bill Clinton and Bill Bradley, in 2005. The couple have a daughter.

Filmography

Falling Skies 
 "Silent Kill" (1.05)
 "Mutiny" (1.09)
 "Love and Other Acts of Courage" (2.05)

Damages 
 "Next One's on Me, Blondie" (4.04)

The Americans 
 "Pilot" (1.01)
 "The Clock" (1.02)
 "In Control" (co-written with Joel Fields) (1.04)
 "Mutually Assured Destruction" (co-written with Joel Fields) (1.08)
 "The Colonel" (co-written with Joel Fields) (1.13)
 "Comrades" (co-written with Joel Fields) (2.01)
 "Cardinal" (co-written with Joel Fields) (2.02)
 "Operation Chronicle" (co-written with Joel Fields) (2.12)
 "Echo" (co-written with Joel Fields) (2.13)
 "EST Men" (co-written with Joel Fields) (3.01)
 "Baggage" (co-written with Joel Fields) (3.02)
 "Stingers" (co-written with Joel Fields) (3.10)
 "March 8, 1983" (co-written with Joel Fields) (3.13)
 "Glanders" (co-written with Joel Fields) (4.01)
 "Pastor Tim" (co-written with Joel Fields) (4.02)
 "Roy Rogers in Franconia" (co-written with Joel Fields) (4.12)
 "Persona Non Grata" (co-written with Joel Fields) (4.13)
 "Amber Waves" (co-written with Joel Fields) (5.01)
 "Pests" (co-written with Joel Fields) (5.02)
 "The World Council of Churches" (co-written with Joel Fields) (5.12)
 "The Soviet Division" (co-written with Joel Fields) (5.13)
 "Dead Hand" (co-written with Joel Fields) (6.01)
 "Tchaikovsky" (co-written with Joel Fields) (6.02)
 "Jennings, Elizabeth" (co-written with Joel Fields) (6.09)
 "START" (co-written with Joel Fields) (6.10)

Bibliography
10th Grade (2002)
An Ordinary Spy (2008)

References

External links

The Americans (2013 TV series)
Living people
American television writers
Yale University alumni
American male television writers
Jewish American writers
Year of birth missing (living people)
Place of birth missing (living people)
People of the Central Intelligence Agency
Showrunners
Schoolteachers from New York (state)
21st-century American novelists
American male novelists
Writers from Chicago
Novelists from Illinois
Primetime Emmy Award winners
Screenwriters from Illinois
21st-century American screenwriters
21st-century American male writers
21st-century American Jews